Acridocephala alboannulata is a species of beetle in the family Cerambycidae. It was described by Stephan von Breuning in 1936. It is known from Gabon.

References

Endemic fauna of Gabon
alboannulata
Beetles described in 1936